Anna Maria Thelott (1683–1710) was a Swedish artist. She was an engraver, an illustrator, a woodcut-artist, and a miniaturist painter.

Biography
Anna Maria Thelott was born in Uppsala, Sweden. She was the daughter of  engraver and watchmaker Philip Jacob Thelott the Elder (1635-1710),  She was the sister of academic  Philip Jacob Thelott the Younger (1682-1750) and half-sister of the engraver Olof Thelott (ca 1670-1728). Her parents had emigrated from Switzerland to Uppsala in the 1670s. She and her brothers were educated by her father in his trade, and active as the assistants in his studio as children. They were all assigned to assist him when he was commissioned by Olof Rudbeck (1630-1702) to illustrate his  four volumes work  Atlantica (Atland eller Manheim) and Campus Elysii.

She also accepted individual commissions early own to contribute to the support of the family. She performed commissions of illustrations by method of drawing, chalcography, copper engraving, India ink and woodcut. Among her many commissions were woodcut for the paper Posttidningen, chalcography for prayer books and, in collaboration with her brother Philip, India ink for the illustration of weapons. She made eleven woodcuts of German cities with texts for the paper Posttidningen in 1706. She was also frequently illustrated the work of Johan Peringskiöld  (1654–1720). Her motif include animals, landscapes, allegory, maps and religious motives. She signed her work "Anna Marija ein geborene Thelotten".

After the great fire of Uppsala in 1702, the family moved to Stockholm. Her father lived in her household rather than that of her brothers, and she supported him when he could no longer work. In 1710, Anna Maria Thelott became one of the many victims of the 1710–1713 plague of Sweden, and died in Stockholm at the age of twenty-seven. She left a sketch book composed in 1704-1709, which is preserved at the University of Uppsala.

References

Other sources
 Österberg, Carin et al., Svenska kvinnor: föregångare, nyskapare. Lund: Signum 1990.
  	Nordisk familjebok / Uggleupplagan. 28. Syrten-vikarna - Tidsbestämning /
 En mamsell i akademien. Ulrica Fredrica Pasch och 1700-talets konstvärld. av Anna Lena Lindberg, Stockholm: Signum, 2010.

Further reading

 

1683 births
1710 deaths
Portrait miniaturists
18th-century deaths from plague (disease)
Infectious disease deaths in Sweden
Woodcut designers
17th-century Swedish painters
18th-century Swedish painters
18th-century Swedish women artists
17th-century women artists
Swedish illustrators
Swedish women illustrators
People from Uppsala
Artists from Stockholm
Women printmakers
People of the Swedish Empire
Women graphic designers
Swedish women painters